Vivienne Linette van den Assem (born 15 November 1983) is a Dutch actress and presenter.

Life

Youth
Van den Assem spent her childhood in Oud-Beijerland. She attended the atheneum at the CSG Willem van Oranje. In her fourth class of the atheneum, she combined school with acting. In the summer holidays between the fifth and sixth year she moved to The Hague. Van den Assem completed the atheneum and followed a course in production support at the Netherlands Film and Television Academy.

Career
After she started playing, dancing and singing at Jeugdtheater Hofplein from her thirteenth lessons, she got her first role in Goudkust as Sophie Bergman. She fulfilled her role from 2000 to 2001. Then she played in the film Emergency Exit and she started the role of Lizzy Vehmeijer in Onderweg naar Morgen. She fulfilled her last role until 2003.

In the theatre van den Assem played in De Bruiloft (1998), Nieuwe Gods (1999), Twelfth Night (2000) and En als het mijn beurt is zal ik zeggen dat het prachtig was en dat ik het voor geen goud had willen missen (2001).

Van den Assem played in Zoop on Nickelodeon and the films Zoop in Africa and Zoop in India. Van den Assem only saw a few scenes in Zoop in South America that were all recorded in the Netherlands.

In the period from 2004 to 2007 Van den Assem, together with Chris Silos, presented the television programme At Nick on Nickelodeon. On the occasion of the World Cup 2006, the variation Nick At Goes WK was made.

As a substitute for At Nick, Van den Assem presented Supernick together with Patrick Martens around 2007.

Van den Assem presented together with Chris Silos the Nickelodeon Netherlands Kids' Choice Awards of 2005, in 2007 she also did this, then together with Patrick Martens. In 2007 she herself was nominated in the category Best TV Star, she ended behind actress Loek Beernink. She received awards at the Nickelodeon Kids' Choice Awards of 2005 in Rotterdam Ahoy:
Best TV Star
Best Film (Zoop in Africa)
Best Television Programme (Zoop)

Besides acting she is also active in the music world, she sang on the singles; Wat ik wil met Kerstmis... ben jij! and Kon het elke dag maar Kerstmis zijn.

Since 2006 Van den Assem is the ambassador of Kids against Violence.

Van den Assem dubbed in 2007 of the penguin Lani in the Dutch version of the animated film Surf's Up. She also dubbed EVE in the Disney Pixar film WALL-E.

From 2008 Van den Assem performs the role of Sonja Zelenko in the Dutch crime series Deadline (VARA). In 2009 Van den Assem participated in Wie is de Mol? in Northern Ireland and Jordan. She won the game, and got a pot of 22,650 euros, with as mole Jon van Eerd.

From October 2010 she takes the presentation of Te leuk om waar te zijn for Zapp for her account. She also gave the points for the Netherlands in the final of the Eurovision Song Contest 2012.

Since 2016 she is one of the presenters of the morning programme Goedemorgen Nederland at NPO 1.

From 2 January 2017 she was in the new programming on NPO Radio 2. Van den Assem will present once a week from 02:00 to 04:00.

Filmography/Television

Films

TV series

Guest roles

Presentation

Discography

References

External links

 

1983 births
Living people
Dutch television presenters
Dutch women television presenters
Dutch television actresses
People from Oud-Beijerland
Nationaal Songfestival presenters
21st-century Dutch women